Nicolas Vanhootegem (born 7 October 1972) is a Belgian professional golfer.

Career
Vanhootegem was born in Brussels. He won several tree international tournaments as an amateur, including the Belgium international, the Luxembourg international and the Welsh Open Stroke Play, turned professional in 1994. He has spent his career fluctuating between membership of the main European Tour and the second tier Challenge Tour.

Vanhootegem has won three tournaments on the Challenge Tour, he lost in play off against Thomas Bjorn on his first Challenge Tour professional event in 1995 and in his second professional event, he as won the Neuchatel Open SBS Trophy Switserland, the 2002 Aa St Omer Open France, and the 2007 Telenet Trophy, which was held in his home country. He also won the 1991, 1993 and 1997 Omnium of Belgium. He represented his country at the World Cup & european Cup as a amateur player.

Amateur wins
1991 Welsh Amateur Open Stroke Play Championship, Luxembourg Amateur Open Championship, Belgium International Championship, Omnium of Belgium
1991-93 Omnium of Belgium

Professional wins (5)

Challenge Tour wins (3)

BeNeLux Golf Tour wins (1)

Other wins (1)
1997 Omnium of Belgium

Results in major championships

"T" = tied
Note: Vanhootegem only played in The Open Championship.

Team appearances
Amateur
European Boys' Team Championship (representing Belgium): 1990
Eisenhower Trophy (representing Belgium): 1992, 1994
St Andrews Trophy (representing the Continent of Europe): 1992, 1994

References

External links

Belgian male golfers
European Tour golfers
Sportspeople from Brussels
1972 births
Living people